Army Life; or, How Soldiers Are Made: Mounted Infantry is a 1900 British short black-and-white silent propaganda actuality film, directed by Robert W. Paul, featuring the King's Own Royal Lancaster Regiment riding over a plain.

The original two-hour programme was shown in two parts; the first covered the process from recruitment to initial training, and contained five sections: Joining the Army, Training at the Regimental Depot, Camp Life at Aldershot, Army Gymnastics at the Central Gymnasium, Aldershot and The Comissionaire Corps; while the second explored the various branches of the army, and included Training of Cavalry at Canterbury, Royal Army Medical Corps, Royal Horse Artillery at Woolwich, Army Service Corps, Garrison Artillery, Infantry (from which this surviving fragment comes) and Royal Engineers.

The film is included on the BFI DVD R.W. Paul: The Collected Films 1895-1908.

References

External links

British black-and-white films
British silent short films
1900s documentary films
1900s war films
British documentary films
British war films
Films directed by Robert W. Paul